South Mountain is a mountain in Greene County, New York. It is located in the Catskill Mountains southeast of Halcott Center. Brush Ridge is located southwest, and Halcott Mountain is located east of South Mountain.

References

Mountains of Greene County, New York
Mountains of New York (state)